Skydiggers is a 1991 eponymous album by Skydiggers.

The album's most successful single was "I Will Give You Everything".

Track listing
 "Monday Morning" (P.Cash/Finlayson/Macey/Maize/Stokes) – 2:26
 "At 24" (P.Cash) – 2:27
 "Maybe It's Just Not Good Enough" (P.Cash/Finlayson/Maize/Macey/Stokes) – 4:02
 "Baby Make A Grab" (Finlayson/Maize) – 2:54
 "I Will Give You Everything" (Finlayson/Maize) – 3:56
 "Leslie" (Finlayson/Maize/Stokes) – 2:25
 "We Don't Talk Much Anymore" (P. Cash) – 2:12
 "I'll Be Home" (P.Cash) – 3:04 
 "Too Bad You Say It's Over" (Archibald/Finlayson/Maize/Stokes) – 2:24
 "Some Say" (P.Cash) – 3:36
 "What Can I Say" (P.Cash) – 3:39
 "No One Could" (P.Cash) – 3:05

1990 debut albums
Skydiggers albums